The 1951 Major League Baseball All-Star Game was the 18th playing of the midsummer classic between the all-stars of the American League (AL) and National League (NL), the two leagues comprising Major League Baseball. The game was held on July 10, 1951, at Briggs Stadium in Detroit, Michigan the home of the Detroit Tigers of the American League. The game resulted in the National League defeating the American League 8–3.

Summary
The 1951 game was originally awarded to the Philadelphia Phillies. The City of Detroit was celebrating the 250th anniversary of its founding in 1701 and requested to host the year's All-Star Game. Although the National League was scheduled to host the game in '51, the game was moved to Detroit. The Phillies hosted the 1952 Game.

Long-time Tigers player and broadcaster Harry Heilmann died at age 56 in Detroit the day prior to the game. A moment of silence was observed in Heilmann's memory prior to the game's start.

The American League was 7–5 favorites to win the game. The ceremonial first pitch was delivered by Ty Cobb. Chico Carrasquel became the first Latin American player in Major League history to start in an All-Star game.

Opening Lineups

Rosters
Players in italics have since been inducted into the National Baseball Hall of Fame.

Line Score

Play-by-play at Retrosheet

References

Further reading

External links
Baseball Almanac: 1951 All-Star Game
MLB.com: 1951 All-Star Game

Major League Baseball All-Star Game
Major League Baseball All-Star Game
Major League Baseball All Star Game
July 1951 sports events in the United States
Baseball competitions in Detroit
1951 in Detroit